Genabea is a genus of fungus in the family Pyronemataceae. The genus contains five species, and the type species is Genabea fragilis, a mycorrhizal truffle-like fungus found in Europe and North America.

References

External links
 

Pyronemataceae
Taxa described in 1845
Fungi of Europe
Fungi of North America
Monotypic Ascomycota genera
Truffles (fungi)
Taxa named by Edmond Tulasne